Vivir Sin Miedo (To Live Without Fear) is the sixth  studio album by Spanish singer Concha Buika. The record was released on 16 October 2015 via DRO Records and EastWest labels.

Track listing

Personnel
Adapted from AllMusic.com
 Buika - Bass, Drum Programming, Guitar, Keyboards, Primary Artist, Producer, Programming, Vocals
 Martin Terefe - Bass, Double Bass, Guitar (Acoustic), Guitar (Electric), Producer, Ukulele, Vocals (Background)
 Oscar Winberg - Engineer, Guitar (Electric), Juno, Mellotron, Programming, Vocals (Background)
 Glen Scott - Drums, Fender Rhodes, Organ, Percussion, Piano, Programming, Synthesizer, Synthesizer Bass, Vocals (Background), Wurlitzer
 Kristoffer Sonne - Drums
 Jason Mraz - Featured Artist, Vocals
 Carlos Sosa - Saxophone
 Raul Vallego - Trombone
 Paul Armstrong - Trumpet
 Andre de Lange - Vocals (Background)
 Josué Rodriguez Fernandez - Bass
 Fetsum Sebhat - Vocals (Background)
 Fred Man - Vocals (Background)
 Jordana Mba - Vocals (Background)
 "Dizzy" Daniel Moorehead - Alto Sax
 Nana Clara Aldrin-Quaye - Vocals (Background)
 Piraña Porrina - Percussion
 Ramón Porrina - Percussion
 Sabú Porrina -Percussion
 Meshell Ndegeocello - Bass
 Eduardo De La Paz - Mix engineer
 Geoff Pesche - Mastering engineer
 Javi Rojo - Photography

References

External links

2015 albums
Concha Buika albums
Spanish-language albums